Andreas Michaelides (born in Limassol, December 29, 1952) is a Cypriot manager, the president of Cypriot Managers Federation, and member of the House of Representatives of Cyprus. He started his coaching career at 1979, and during the season 2010–11, after he was appointed Apollon Limassol manager, he made a domestic record, becoming the first manager in charge of all major teams in Cyprus.

Approach and philosophy
Michaelides has been described as a coach who gives emphasis on player psychology. Furthermore, has a strong reputation of getting the best out of players with technical abilities. A notable example was during the 1990s, when Michaelides guided Costas Malekkos to his best footballing years of his career. Moreover, he is largely acknowledged for the development of Constantinos Charalambidis and Moustapha Bangura.

Cyprus national football team
Michaelides is considered one of the best managers of the Cyprus national football team. He managed the team for five years (1991–1996), having been in charge for 48 matches, making his debut October 16, 1991, at the match Cyprus-Iceland (1-1).

Manager Statistics

Politics
Michaelides was elected in the House of Representatives of Cyprus on May 22, 2011, for the Cypriot legislative election running under right-wingers DISY party, in Limassol district. He received 9872 votes.

Honours

Manager

Aris Limassol
Runner-up
Cypriot Cup: 1988-89

Omonia
Runner-up
Cypriot Cup: 1996-97
Cypriot First Division: 1997–98
Cypriot First Division: 1998–99

APOEL
Runner-up
Cypriot Cup: 1999-00

Anorthosis
Winner
Cypriot Cup: 2002-03

Apollon Limassol
Runner-up
Cypriot Cup: 2010-11

References

External links

1952 births
Living people
Cypriot footballers
Cyprus international footballers
Cypriot football managers
Aris Limassol FC managers
AEL Limassol managers
Cyprus national football team managers
Apollon Limassol FC managers
Anorthosis Famagusta F.C. managers
AEP Paphos FC managers
AC Omonia managers
APOEL FC managers
Nea Salamis Famagusta FC managers
AEK Larnaca FC managers
Association football midfielders
Sportspeople from Limassol